The following is a timeline of the history of the city of Milan, Italy.

BC era

 222 BCE - Romans conquer Mediolanum.

3rd–8th centuries
 3rd C. CE - Roman Catholic diocese of Milan established.
 286 CE - Western Roman Empire capital moves from Rome to Mediolanum.
 313 - Edict of Milan.
 370 - Basilica of San Lorenzo consecrated.
 379 - Basilica of Sant'Ambrogio consecrated.
 382 - San Nazaro in Brolo construction begins.
 402 - City besieged by Visigoths.
 452 - City besieged by Huns.
 539 - City sacked by Ostrogoths.
 569 - Lombards conquer city.
 774 - Milan surrenders to the Franks.
 833 - San Vincenzo in Prato built.
 899 - Hunnish invasion

11th century
 1045 - Milan adopts the commune form of local city-state government.

12th–14th centuries

 1135 - Chiaravalle Abbey founded.
 1157 - Circular moat, (Naviglio), constructed round the town. 
 1158 - Holy Roman Emperor Frederick Barbarossa besieges and sacks the city, but it soon rebels.
 1162 - Holy Roman Emperor Frederick Barbarossa seizes and destroys the city.
 1183 - After the Peace of Constance Milan returns to the commune form of government.
 13th C. - Palazzo Borromeo (Milan) established.
 1233 - Palazzo della Ragione built.
 1237 - After the Battle of Cortenuova Pagano della Torre rallied and saved Milan. 
 1259 - Milan is ruled as a Signoria with the Della Torre family ruling as Signores.
 1277
 The Battle of Desio is fought between the Della Torre and Visconti families for the control of Milan.
 The Visconti of Milan emerges as the victors at Desio and begin their rule of Milan as the Signores.
 1302 - Guido della Torre deposes Matteo I Visconti as the Signore.	
 1311 - Henry VII restores Matteo I Visconti as the Signore. 
 1321 - Loggia degli Osii built, with two open porticos in black and white marble.
 1330
 Piazza del Duomo, Milan work begins.
 San Gottardo, Milan work begins.
 1336 - Public clock installed.
 1360 - Castello Sforzesco construction begun.
 1381 - Chiesa di Santa Maria alla Scala built.
 1386 - Milan Cathedral begins construction.
 1395 - Milan is formally elevated to a Duchy when Wenceslaus IV titles Gian Galeazzo Visconti the Duke of Milan.

15th–16th centuries
 1412 - Gian Maria Visconti assassinated in front of the San Gottardo, Milan.
 1447
 The death of Filippo Maria Visconti (1392–1447) ends more than two centuries of Visconti rule in Milan.
 The House of Sforza takes power.
 The Golden Ambrosian Republic begins.
 1456 - Ospedale Maggiore begins construction.
 1463 - Santa Maria delle Grazie, Milan begun.
 1471 - Printing press in operation.
 1482 - Santa Maria delle Grazie built.
 1493 - Santa Maria presso San Celso begins construction.
 1496 - Chiesa di Santa Maria della Passione built.
 1497 - Apicius de re Coquinaria cookbook published.
 1498 - Leonardo paints The Last Supper in the Santa Maria delle Grazie church.
 1508 - Santa Maria alla Fontana built.
 1515 - Battle of Marignano and Francis I of France takes Milan.
 1522 - Francesco II Sforza in power.
 1535 - City becomes part of Habsburg Spain.
 1562 - Palazzo dei Giureconsulti begins construction.
 1565 - Casa degli Omenoni built (approximate date).
 1577 - Milan Cathedral consecrated by Charles Borromeo, cardinal saint.
 1579 - San Fedele built.
 1580 - Plague.

17th century
 1608 - Palazzo del Senato construction begins.
 1609 - Biblioteca Ambrosiana opens.
 1618 - Pinacoteca Ambrosiana opens.
 1630 - Plague begins.
 1631 - Palazzo Annoni construction begins.
 1640 - The gazette named Milano was published for the first time.
 1644 - Palazzo delle Scuole Palatine rebuilt.

18th century
 1717 - Teatro Regio Ducale built.
 1761 - Palazzo Litta built.
 1762 - Madonnina (statue) erected.
 1772 - Royal Palace of Milan renovated.
 1774 - Orto Botanico di Brera (garden) established.
 1776 - Brera Academy founded.
 1778
 La Scala inaugurated.
 Royal Palace of Milan expanded.
 1779 - Teatro Lirico built.
 1784 - Giardini Pubblici Indro Montanelli established.
 1785 - The newspaper Il Corriere di Gabinetto - Gazzetta di Milano was published for the first time.
 1786
 Biblioteca di Brera (library) opens.
  (state archives) established.
 1793 - Palazzo Serbelloni built.
 1796 - Milan declared capital of Cisalpine Republic.

19th century
 1802 - Milan becomes capital of the Napoleonic Italian Republic.
 1805 - Coronation of Napoleon as King of Italy.
 1807
 Milan Conservatory established.
 Arena Civica opened.
 1808
  established.
 Casa Ricordi music publisher in business.
 1817 - Caffè Cova in business on Via Monte Napoleone.
 1820 - Revolutionary Carbonari arrested.
 1824 - Pasticceria Marchesi in business.
 1838 - Museo Civico di Storia Naturale di Milano founded.
 1840 - Milan-Monza railway begins operating.
 1842 - Premiere of Verdi's opera Nabucco.
 1848 - Five Days uprising against Austrian Empire.
 1860
 Campari in business.
 Antonio Beretta becomes mayor.
 1861
 Milan becomes part of Kingdom of Italy.
 City hall opens in Palazzo Marino.
 1863 - Istituto Tecnico Superiore founded.
 1866 - Cimitero Monumentale di Milano opened.
 1870 - Hoepli publisher in business.
 1871 - Population: 261,976.
 1872
 Pirelli company founded.
 Ca' de Sass built.
 Teatro Dal Verme opens.
 1873 - Società Storica Lombarda (history society) founded.
 1876
 Corriere della Sera newspaper begins publication.
 Trams begin operating.
 1877 - Galleria Vittorio Emanuele II built.
 1879
 Milano Affori railway station and Milano Bovisa-Politecnico railway station open.
 "Società d'Esplorazione Commerciale in Africa" founded.
 1881 - Population: 321,839.
 1883 - Salumi  in business.
 1886
 Breda manufactory in business.
 German School of Milan founded.
 Piazza della Scala established.
 1888 
 Parco Sempione established.
 Via Dante constructed.
 1894 - Touring Club Italiano established.
 1896
 Casa di Riposo per Musicisti founded.
 Italo Pacchioni creates "first Italian film" Arrivo del treno alla Stazione di Milano.
 1897 - Population: 470,558.
 1898 - Bava-Beccaris massacre.
 1899
 Milan Football and Cricket Club founded.
 Parini statue erected in Piazza Cordusio.

20th century

1900s–1940s
 1902 - Bocconi University founded.
 1903 - Palazzo Castiglioni built.
 1906
 Confederazione Generale del Lavoro (labor union) headquartered in Milan.
 Milan International (1906) world's fair held
 Simplon Tunnel opens.
 Casa Campanini built.
 Population: 560,613.
 1907 -  (shoe shop) in business.
 1908 - Internazionale Milano football club founded.
 1909 - Malpensa Airport established.
 1911 -  in business.
 1912 - Messina tram depot built.
 1915
 Castello Cova built.
 American Chamber of Commerce established.
 1917
 Galleria Pesaro opens.
 La Rinascente (shop) in business.
 1919 - Fascio di Combattimento political group founded.
 1921
 Milan Sample Fair begins.
 Università Cattolica del Sacro Cuore established.
 1922 - Novecento Italiano art movement active.
 1924 - University of Milan founded.
 1926 - Stadio San Siro opens.
 1927 - A. Rizzoli & Co. founded.
 1930 - Planetario di Milano inaugurated.
 1931 - Milano Centrale railway station opens.
 1932 - Palazzo Mezzanotte (stock exchange) built.
 1933
 Trolleybuses begin operating.
 Torre Branca built in Parco Sempione.
 1934 - Institute for International Political Studies founded.
 1935 -  (residence) built.
 1937 - Linate Airport opens.
 1939
 A.C. Milan football club active.
 Anteo Spazio Cinema opens.
 1942 -  opens.
 1945 - 29 April: Corpse of executed Mussolini brought to Piazzale Loreto.
 1947 - Piccolo Teatro founded.

1950s–1990s
 1954 - Padiglione d'Arte Contemporanea inaugurated.
 1955
 FrancoAngeli publisher in business.
 Centro di Documentazione Ebraica Contemporanea founded.
 1956 - Palazzo dell'Arengario built.
 1958 - Milan Fashion Week begins.
 1960 - Cinema Ambasciatori opens.
 1961 - Milan Furniture Fair begins.
 1962 - Amica fashion magazine in publication.
 1964 - Milan Metro begins operating.
 1965 - Milan Cathedral final details completed.
 1968 - IULM University of Milan founded.
 1969 - Piazza Fontana bombing.
 1974 -  theatre troupe founded.
 1975 - Armani fashion house founded.
 1979 - MIP- Politecnico di Milano School of Management formed.
 1980
  opens.
 Parco Alessandrini inaugurated.
 1982 - Domus Academy established.
 1985 - Dolce & Gabbana fashion house founded.
 1986 - Class Editori founded.
 1987
 MF Milano Finanza newspaper begins publication.
 Massimo De Carlo art gallery opens.
 1990
 Milan Metro Line 3 begins operating.
 Parco Agricolo Sud Milano established.
 1991
 Viafarini (art entity) established.
 10 Corso Como in business.
 1995 - Documentation Center for Visual Arts founded.
 1996 - Vita-Salute San Raffaele University and Trussardi Foundation established.
 1997 - Milan Passante railway begins operating.
 1998 - University of Milan Bicocca established.
 1999 - Malpensa Express begins operating.

21st century

 2001
 23 May: 2001 UEFA Champions League Final held in Milan.
 8 October: Linate Airport disaster.
 City website online (approximate date).
 O’artoteca (art organization) founded.
 2002
 Orto Botanico di Cascina Rosa established.
 Teatro degli Arcimboldi opens.
 2004
  architects active.
 Bulgari Hotel in business.
 2006
 Lettera27 headquartered in Milan.
 Letizia Moratti becomes mayor.
 2008
 BikeMi launched.
 Ecopass congestion charge begins.
 2009
 Peep Hole and Cardi Black Box art gallery active.
 Homeless World Cup football contest held.
 2010 - Population: 1,315,803.
 2011 - Giuliano Pisapia becomes mayor.
 2012
 Portello Park inaugurated.
 Milan Area C congestion charge begins, replacing Ecopass.
 Nuovo Trasporto Viaggiatori high-speed train service begins operating, connecting Milan to Naples via Rome.
 2013 - Population: 1,262,101 municipality; 3,075,083 province.
 2015 - 1 May: Expo 2015 world fair opens.
 2016 - June: Milan municipal election, 2016 held.

See also
 History of Milan (it)
 List of mayors of Milan
 List of rulers of Milan

Timelines of other cities in the macroregion of Northwest Italy:(it)
 Liguria region: Timeline of Genoa
 Lombardy region: Timeline of Bergamo; Brescia; Cremona; Mantua; Pavia
 Piedmont region: Timeline of Novara; Turin

References

This article incorporates information from the Italian Wikipedia.

Bibliography

Published in the 16th-19th century
in English
 
 
 
 
 
 
 
 
 
 
 
 
 
 
 
 

in other languages
 
 ; 2nd edn (1619) with additions by Girolamo Borsieri, Milan: Bidelli.

Published in the 20th century
in English
 
 
 
 
 
  + 1870 ed.
 
 
 
 
 

in Italian
 
 
  1953-1966 (17 volumes)
 Luigi Ganapini. Una città in guerra (Milano, 1939-1951) (Milan: Angeli, 1988)
 Achille Rastelli. Bombe sulla città. Gli attacchi aerei alleati: le vittime civili a Milano (Milan: Mursia, 2000)

Published in the 21st century
in English

 
 
 

 
 
 

in Italian
 Francesco Ogliari. Fiamme su Milano: I bombardamenti aerei 1940-1945 (Pavia: Selecta, 2005)

External links

 Europeana. Items related to Milan, various dates.
 Digital Public Library of America. Items related to Milan, various dates

Milan
Milan-related lists